William J. Rogers (December 9, 1930 – November 8, 2005) was an American politician and teacher.

Rogers was born in Appleton, Wisconsin. During the Korean War, he served in the United States Army from 1952 to 1954. He went to the Mexico City College and then received his bachelor's degree from St. Norbert College, Rogers was a teacher. Rogers served in the Wisconsin State Assembly from 1963 to 1985. Rogers was a Democrat. He lived in Kaukauna, Wisconsin. Rogers died on November 8, 2005, at the age of 74.

References

External links

1930 births
2005 deaths
Democratic Party members of the Wisconsin State Assembly
Educators from Wisconsin
Military personnel from Wisconsin
United States Army soldiers
United States Army personnel of the Korean War
Politicians from Appleton, Wisconsin
People from Kaukauna, Wisconsin
St. Norbert College alumni
20th-century American politicians
Mexico City College alumni